Kim Do-yeop (born November 26, 1988) is a South Korean football player who plays for K League 2 side Asan Mugunghwa. He changed his name from 'Kim In-han' in 2014.

Career statistics

Gyeongnam FC

Originally named as "Kim In-Han" was drafted to Gyeongnam FC from Sunmoon University as their 3rd choice in 2010 and since then, he only played for Gyeongnam FC, except for a period, where he went to Sangju Sangmu to serve mandatory military service in Korea.

External links
 

1988 births
Living people
People from Nonsan
Association football midfielders
South Korean footballers
Gyeongnam FC players
Gimcheon Sangmu FC players
Jeju United FC players
Seongnam FC players
Asan Mugunghwa FC players
K League 1 players
K League 2 players
Sportspeople from South Chungcheong Province